Athlitiki Enosi Lemesou commonly known as AEL, is a Cypriot sports club based in the city of Limassol, most famous for its football team.

AEL also maintains a men's and women's basketball teams, a women's volleyball team and a (newly established in 1976) Futsal team, a women's handball team as well as a cricket team. AEL is one of the most successful clubs on the island and the most successful in Limassol with 17 official football trophies consisting of 6 first division championships, 7 cups and 4 super cups.

The club was founded on 4 October 1930, with Stavros Pittas serving as the club's first president. The football section of the club competed in its first game on 6 January 1931 against PSC, winning 6–1 in Limassol. The club won the national championship in 1934 though this is not credited as it is an unofficial title. Later that year, AEL became one of the eight founding members of the Cypriot First Division for the 1934–35 season, the first official league of the country.

AEL Limassol celebrated its first official title success in 1941, defeating APOEL 4–3 in a two-legged championship play-off. AEL fans had to wait 12 years until tasting title success again, as the club finally became champions of Cyprus again in 1953. AEL would twice repeat this success, winning back-to-back league championships in 1955 and 1956.

The club won its last major trophy in 1989 – before the title success of 2012 – when it defeated city rivals Aris Limassol 3–2 after extra time in final of the Cypriot Cup.

In 2011, after disappointingly finishing in seventh-place in the previous campaign, AEL hired Pambos Christodoulou, who had a reputation of steering "modest sides away from relegation", to start the club's rebuilding process. AEL Limassol secured the Cypriot league title for the first time since 1968 on 5 May 2012, ending a 44-year drought without a Cypriot first division title.

Christodoulou had a dream-like first season at the helm AEL, as his side was unbeaten and had not conceded any goals through the first five games. At the end of the second round, AEL finished top of the table, three points clear of the second placed team and had only conceded seven goals, the best defensive record of all the league teams. In the play-off round, AEL battled with the top four teams for the championship, winning it with one game to spare and conceding only nine goals. As Christodoulou has managed to bring AEL the championship crown, he was nicknamed by fans "Pambourinho", a combination of his name and of esteemed manager José Mourinho.

AEL received the championship trophy during a spectacular "fiesta" evening at the Tsirio Stadium on the evening of Saturday 12 May 2012. They followed this with an open-top bus parade through Limassol. Up to 12,000 AEL fans packed the stadium to watch the fiesta and trophy presentation. The club then turned their attention to the Cup Final of 16 May against Omonia and the chance to be crowned double winners for the first time in club history; the club, however, lost 1–0 in the final. The following year, AEL made it to the group stage of a UEFA tournament for the first time, finishing last and picking up four points in their UEFA Europa League group.

On 22 October 2013, Angolan manager Lito Vidigal was sacked after just over three months in charge. Bulgarian Ivaylo Petev was appointed as AEL's manager on 25 October, having previously guided Ludogorets Razgrad to promotion to the A Group as well as two A Group titles, a Bulgarian Cup win as well as a triumph in the Bulgarian Super Cup. Petev signed an initial deal to stay at AEL until the end of the 2014–15 season.

At the end of the 2013–14 season, AEL finished in first place in the initial phase of the competition. Going into the championship match against APOEL on 17 May 2014, AEL needed only a draw to secure their second league title in three years. The match, however, was abandoned (at 0–0) after 52 minutes when firecrackers thrown by AEL fans struck APOEL player Kaká. The match was replayed behind closed doors at a neutral stadium on 31 May 2014, and APOEL achieved to win their second consecutive league title after beating AEL 1–0, courtesy of a Cillian Sheridan goal. On 6 June 2014, the Cyprus Football Association's (CFA) disciplinary committee – acting as an appeals board – unanimously cancelled on the CFA council's decision to repeat the 17 May championship final, awarding the match to APOEL with a 0–3 score. AEL winger Jorge Monteiro finished the season as joint-top scorer in the league with 18 goals, and the former Porto academy product was voted player of the year by the CFA. AEL finished in the 4th place of the championship of 2016–2017 and as a result the team won a place in the first qualifying round of Europa League. Furthermore, AEL achieved to go up to third qualifying round from a not fair play game from the referee Artyom Kuchin and the players of Austria Wien. The referee had show the white dot of the penalty for a ghost faul outside of the box of AEL and a red card for AEL defender Marco Airosa in the twenty second minute. AEL had fight for the win for the whole game to achieve two goals that send her in the play-offs but the score finished 1–2.

AEL LIMASSOL FC as a company
The football department of AEL is legally owned by AEL Football (Public) Ltd, a public limited company, since 2009. The company's main activity is the management, operation and commercial exploitation of AEL Football club.

Stadium

AEL has been playing its home matches at the 13,331-seat Tsirio Stadium until 2022. Tsirio Stadium is a multi-use stadium in Limassol. It is mostly used for football matches and was also the home ground of Apollon Limassol and Aris Limassol. The stadium was built in 1975.

The construction of the Alphamega Stadium replaced Tsirio Stadium as the home ground of AEL. The capacity of the new stadium is 10,700 seats.

Current squad

Other players under contract

Out on loan

Current staff

Honours
 Cypriot First Division
Champions (6): 1940–41, 1952–53, 1954–55, 1955–56, 1967–68, 2011–12
Runners-up (2): 1947–48, 2013–14
 Cypriot Second Division
Champions: 1996–97
 Cypriot Cup
Champions (7): 1938–39, 1939–40, 1947–48, 1984–85, 1986–87, 1988–89, 2018–19
Runners-up (11): 1937–38, 1940–41, 1958–59, 1978–79, 1987–88, 2002–03, 2003–04, 2008–09, 2011–12, 2012–13, 2014–15
 Cypriot Super Cup
Champions (4): 1953, 1968, 1985, 2015
Runners-up (5): 1955, 1987, 1989, 2012, 2019

UEFA club coefficient ranking
UEFA Team Ranking 2022

UEFA Club ranking

Last update: 1 January 2023
 Source:

European record
1R = First round, PR = Preliminary round, Q = Qualifying round, PO = play-off round.

Managerial history

  Dimitris Tsiepis (1930–32)
  Argiris Gavalas (1932–46) 
  Costas Vasiliou (1946–48)
  Argiris Gavalas (1948–56)
  Spiros Elia
  Ferdinard Ceplar
  Christos Christodoulou
  Ulhen Fitz
  Georgios Eisaggeleas
  Costas Pambou "Mavrokolos"
  Nicolae Simatoc (1962–63)
  Loizos Pantelidis (1968–69)
  František Havránek (1984–86)
  Valér Švec (1986–88)
  Dušan Uhrin (1988–89)
  Jiri Dunaj (1989–90)
  František Cipro (1990–92)
  Anatoliy Byshovets (1992–93)
  Andreas Kissonergis (1995)
  Diethelm Ferner (1995–96)
  Kálmán Mészöly (1997–98)
  Andreas Michaelides (July 2000 – Sept 2002)
  Giannis Matzourakis (Sept 2002 – Nov 3)
  Henk Houwaart (Nov 2003 – 31 December 2004)
  Oleh Protasov (Dec 2004 – March 5)
  Andreas Michaelides (March 2005 – May 5)
  Bojan Prašnikar (1 July 2005 – 30 November 2005)
  Loizos Mavroudis (Feb 2006 – May 6)
  Panicos Orphanides (July 2006 – Jan 7)
  Eli Guttman (Feb 2007 – Dec 7)
  Mariano Barreto (4 December 2007 – 5 February 2008)
  Andreas Michaelides (Feb 2008 – Jan 2009)
  Mihai Stoichiță (26 January 2009 – 20 May 2009)
  Nir Klinger (1 August 2009 – 1 December 2009)
  Dušan Uhrin, Jr. (1 January 2010 – 21 September 2010)
  Mihai Stoichiță (22 September 2010 – 7 February 2011)
  Raymond Atteveld (7 February 2011 – May 2011)
  Pambos Christodoulou (24 March 2011 – 22 October 2012)
  Jorge Costa (24 October 2012 – 22 May 2013)
  Lito Vidigal (1 July 2013 – 22 October 2013)
  Ivaylo Petev (25 October 2013 – 17 November 2014)
  Christakis Christoforou (17 November 2014 – 19 October 2015)
  Makis Chavos (27 October 2015 – 8 February 2016)
  Pambos Christodoulou (8 February 2016 – 7 March 2017)
  Bruno Baltazar (22 March 2017 – 5 March 2018)
  Dušan Kerkez (5 March 2018 – 6 December 2021)
  Savvas Pantelidis (8 December 2021 – 20 May 2022)
  Silas (21 May 2022 – 17 September 2022 )
  Cedomir Janevski (17 September 2022- )

Presidential history

AEL Football Academies 

 Cypriot U21 Championships: 13
 1940, 1951, 1960, 1973, 1978, 1983, 1984, 1989, 1998, 1999, 2000, 2002, 2008
Runners-up: 1 
 2012
 Cyprus U21 Cup: 1
 1997

 Cypriot U19 Championships: 1
 2018(Participating 2018–19 UEFA Youth League)

 Cypriot U17 Championships: 6
 2004, 2005, 2007, 2011, 2012, 2018
Runners-up: 1 
 2019
 priot U16 Championships: 1
 2017

 Cypriot U15 Championships: 2
 2005, 2009

 Cypriot U13 Championships: 3
 2006, 2008, 2017

AEL LIMASSOL Basketball Team 

There is a men's and woman's Basketball team with the woman's team known as ASBIS AEL Limassol.

Women volleyball team (Robomarkets AEL) 

A founding member of the Cyprus Volleyball Federation in 1976, AEL's women team has dominated in the Cypriot volleyball. The team's achievements are phenomenal; Out of the 32 seasons played so far in Cyprus since the commencement of the women's volleyball league, the team won the Championship 27 times. Out of the 31 cups they won it 27 times, 24 consecutive times, from 1980 until 2003. Also they have won the Championship 15 consecutive times, from 1977 until 1991. They have also the amazing records of winning the Double 12 times from 1980 until 1991 and 9 times from 1993 until 2001.
In the past the club had also a men's team for 10 years which participated in the Cypriot Championship.

Bowling team
The bowling club was founded in 1999 and the same year became a member of the Limassol District Federation. In 2001, the team participated in the Cypriot Championship as one of the two representatives of the Limassol District Federation. In the team won its first trophy by winning the Limassol District Federation Cup and in 2006 its first Championship by winning the Limassol District Federation Championship. The home of the team is the Galaktika Bowling Center.

Cycling team
The cycling team was founded in 2001 and the same year became a member of the Limassol District Federation. The first men's cycling team consisted of the following : Κωνσταντίνος Ιωάννου, Στέλιος Βασιλάκης, Χριστόφορος Στεφάνου, Αλέξης Κέστας, Mark Williams, Σταύρος Αντωνίου, Χρίστος Παναγιώτου, William de Doncker.

Defunct sports departments
Apart from the currently active sports departments, AEL had in the past some other sports departments, which today are defunct. Despite this, these currently not active departments had all won titles for AEL when they were active.

Field hockey
In the past AEL Limassol had a field hockey team which is currently not active. The team had plenty of victories led by its star player Renos Antoniadis. In 1931, AEL won the Cup in a match which was played in Larnaca. One year later, the team became Cypriot Champions. The team consisted of the following players: Antoniadis, Pareas, Frangos, Christophides, Michaelides, Kalogirou, Victor Mousteris, Anastasiadis and Williamson. However, there were no further hockey competitions in Cyprus afterwards, as the other teams hockey teams of the era closed down their hockey departments because of financial problems.

Handball
Another AEL sport department that currently does not exist is the handball.
The team was active for a small period of time but that did not stop the team from adding another trophy to the hundreds that AEL won in various other sports. On 11 June 1989, a day after the football team of the club won the Cypriot Cup, the handball team won the Cypriot Cup in handball by beating Youth Centre Larnaca 23–19 in the final which was played in Lefkotheo Indoor Hal, Nicosia.

Volleyball
AEL maintains 3 teams for women's volleyball but does not currently have a men's Volleyball team.

Waterpolo
AEL was also active in maritime sports, especially those that needed team participation. AEL pioneered in Regattas in 1932, 1933 and 1934 in the Cyprus Regatta Games. The members of the team were Nearchos Pieris, Christakis Dixon, Andreas Araouzos, Sotiris Antoniades and Maximos Morides. The club had also a waterpolo team which was unbeaten Cypriot Champions. The team achieved a noted victory against a selected team of the Royal Navy which were then Mediterranean Champions. Apart from the Cypriot Championships, AEL won the Mediterranean Naval Cup.

References

External links
 AEL Limassol football club Official Website
 AEL Limassol Club Official Website
 Official SY.F.AEL Fans Website
 Lions Radio Unofficial Fans Website

 
Football clubs in Cyprus
Volleyball clubs in Cyprus
Association football clubs established in 1930
Multi-sport clubs in Cyprus
1930 establishments in Cyprus